Misbah Khan (born 4 December 1989 in Karachi, Pakistan) is a German-Pakistani politician of the Alliance 90/The Greens who has been serving as a [Member of the German Bundestag|member]] of the Bundestag since 2021. She was state chair of the Rhineland-Palatinate Green Party from November 2019 to March 2022.

Early life and career
Khan was born 1989 in Karachi and has lived in Meckenheim since she was 4 years old. She graduated from the Kurfürst-Ruprecht-Gymnasium in Neustadt an der Weinstraße. Khan studied political science and British studies at Johannes Gutenberg University in Mainz. She worked for the Rhineland-Palatinate State Agency for Civic Education, and since 2017 she has worked for the Rhineland-Palatinate State Office for Social Affairs, Youth and Supply in the Democracy Center in the department of religious extremism.

Political career

Early beginnings
Khan has been a member of the Green Party since 2008, and was a member of the Green Youth from 2009 to 2017. Khan was a member of the Deidesheim Municipal Council from 2009 to 2014, and which she rejoined again in 2019. From 2009 to 2011 and again from 2014 to 2016, Khan was a member of the state executive committee of the Green Youth of Rhineland-Palatinate. In the Bad Dürkheim district association, she was a member of the Green Party's district executive committee from 2010 to 2011 and again from 2012 to 2016. At the state level, she has been active as spokesperson for the state working group Peace & International Affairs since 2014.

Khan ran in the 2016 state election in Rhineland-Palatinate in 11th place on the state list and ran in the 2017 German federal election as a direct candidate in the Neustadt – Speyer constituency. At the state delegates' meeting in November 2019, Khan was elected state chair of the Rhineland-Palatinate Green Party.

Member of the German Parliament, 2021–present
In the 2021 German federal election, Khan ran in 5th place on the state list of the Greens of Rhineland-Palatinate and won a mandate in the Bundestag via the list position. 

In parliament, Khan has been serving as a full member of the Committee on Digital Affairs and the Committee on Home Affairs and a deputy member of the Committee on Human Rights and Humanitarian Aid. In this capacity, she is her parliamentary group's rapporteur on feminist digital policy, data protection and privacy rights.

References

External links
 Biography at the German Bundestag
 Misbah Khan on abgeordnetenwatch.de
 Website of Misbah Khan

Living people
1989 births
Politicians from Karachi
Members of the Bundestag 2021–2025
Female members of the Bundestag
Members of the Bundestag for Alliance 90/The Greens
21st-century German women politicians